Karolina Světlá (born Johana Rottová) (24 February 1830 in Prague – 7 September 1899 in Prague) was a Czech female author of the 19th century. She was associated with the literary May School. She married Professor Petr Mužák (1821–1892) in 1852, who had taught her music. She also had an affair with Jan Neruda. She introduced Eliška Krásnohorská to literature and feminism. Her first novel Vesnický román (A Village Novel) was published in 1867. Her other works include Nemodlenec (1873) and Kříž u potoka (adapted into a film of the same name in 1921).

References

External links

 
 Bio details - in Czech

1830 births
1899 deaths
Writers from Prague
People from the Kingdom of Bohemia
Czech feminists
Czech women novelists
19th-century Czech women
19th-century women writers
Czech women's rights activists
19th-century Czech novelists